The Sims is a series of life simulation video games developed by Maxis and published by Electronic Arts. The franchise has sold nearly 200 million copies worldwide, and it is one of the best-selling video game series of all time.

The games in the Sims series are largely sandbox games, in that they lack any defined goals (except for some later expansion packs and console versions which introduced this gameplay style). The player creates virtual people called "Sims", places them in houses, and helps direct their moods and satisfy their desires. Players can either place their Sims in pre-constructed homes or build them themselves. Each successive expansion pack and game in the series augmented what the player could do with their Sims.

The Sims series is part of the larger Sim series, started by SimCity in 1989.

Development 

Game designer Will Wright was inspired to create a "virtual doll house" after losing his home during the Oakland firestorm of 1991 and subsequently rebuilding his life. Replacing his home and his other possessions made him think about adapting that life experience into a game. When Wright initially took his ideas to the Maxis board of directors, they were skeptical and gave little support or financing for the game. The directors at Electronic Arts, which bought Maxis in 1997, were more receptive—SimCity had been a great success for them, and they foresaw the possibility of building a strong Sim franchise.

Wright has stated that The Sims was actually meant as a satire of U.S. consumer culture. Wright took ideas from the 1977 architecture and urban design book A Pattern Language, American psychologist Abraham Maslow's 1943 paper A Theory of Human Motivation and his hierarchy of needs, and Charles Hampden-Turner's Maps of the Mind to develop a model for the game's artificial intelligence.

Games

Main series

The Sims (2000) 

The Sims was the first game in the series. Developed by Maxis and published by Electronic Arts, it was released for Microsoft Windows on February 4, 2000. The game used dimetric projection and featured open-ended simulation of the daily activities of one or more virtual persons ("Sims") in a suburban area near SimCity. Seven expansion packs and two deluxe editions with exclusive content were released. It was repackaged in several different formats, and different versions of it were released on several different platforms. By March 22, 2002, The Sims had sold more than 6.3 million copies worldwide, surpassing Myst  as the best-selling PC game in history at the time. The original game, all seven expansion packs, and the two deluxe edition content packs constitute the first generation of the PC release. Maxis developed all PC releases. By February 2005, the game had shipped 16 million copies worldwide.

The Sims received seven expansion packs:

The Sims 2 (2004) 

Electronic Arts released The Sims 2 on September 14, 2004. The sequel, developed by Maxis, takes place in a full 3D environment as opposed to the dimetric projection of the original game. Sims age through seven life stages, from infancy to old age and subsequent death. Another major feature is the aspiration system. Each Sim exhibits wants and fears according to its aspiration and personality. Consequently, the level of the aspiration meter determines the effectiveness of a Sim at completing tasks. The fulfillment of wants provides aspiration points, which can be used to purchase aspiration rewards. The game also features clear days of the week, with weekends when children can stay home from school and vacation days when adults can take time off work.

The Sims 2 is set some 25 years after the original game. For instance, the Goth family has aged significantly with Bella Goth mysteriously vanishing ("dying") at some point in the 25 years. Because the entire game has progressed from 2D sprites to 3D models, all content in The Sims 2 had to be created from the ground up. Due to this, The Sims 2 was not made backward-compatible with any content from the first generation of the main series. However, some objects and features from the original series were remade for the sequel.

Eight expansion packs and nine "stuff packs" were released for The Sims 2. Over 400 items were also released for the game via The Sims 2 Store.

The Sims 2 received eight expansion packs:

The Sims 3 (2009) 

Electronic Arts released The Sims 3 on June 2, 2009. The sequel was announced by EA in November 2006. The game is set 25 years before the original game and features an open, seamless neighborhood, improved Sim creation tools, enhanced build and buy mode functions, and the introduction of wishes and goals. The game introduced a new form of directed gameplay through small, step-wise goals presented as opportunities for the player to pursue or refuse. The Sims 3 sold 1.4 million copies in the first week, making it the largest release in PC gaming history at the time.

The Sims 3 is set 25 years before The Sims. For example, the Goth family is much younger, and Bella Goth, an adult in the first game, is a child and is named Bella Bachelor.

Eleven expansion packs and nine "stuff packs" were released for The Sims 3. In addition, many items are available online for additional fees at The Sims 3 Store.

The Sims 3 received eleven expansion packs:

The Sims 4 (2014) 

Electronic Arts announced The Sims 4 on May 6, 2013. The announcement stated that the game was in development by Maxis. The Sims 4 takes place in an alternative setting/timeline from the game's previous installments. Later in 2014, further details on features and gameplay were announced. The release date of September 2, 2014, was announced at E3 2014.

As of January 2023, twelve expansion packs, twelve "game packs", eighteen "stuff packs", and ten "kits" have been released, and updates have added content that was previously absent, such as basements, ghosts, pools, modular stairs, toddlers, new careers, terrain tools, additional skin tones, and bunk beds. The Sims 4 was made free-to-play on October 18, 2022.

The Sims 4 has received twelve expansion packs so far:

The Sims 4 has also received twelve "game packs" so far:

Project Rene (TBA) 
On October 18, 2022, Maxis announced that they are working on the next installment of The Sims, which is code named "Project Rene". The game allows solo or collaborative play and cross-play. Room customization works differently compared to The Sims 4, with more customization options being presented for furniture. In this project, the buy-and-build mode is multiplayer and players can customize the buildings at the same time. Maxis said they are still working on this title and will give more information and updates about it.

Spin-offs 
On January 6, 2017, a fan-made relaunch of The Sims Online was created by Rhys Simpson, FreeSO and was released in an "open beta" phase. As of May 1, 2017, the majority of the original The Sims Online functions were re-implemented to include 3D functions. Some of the existing changes have included category functions.

The Sims Stories 

The Sims Stories is a series of video games from The Sims series released in 2007–2008 based on a modified version of The Sims 2 game engine. The modified engine is optimized for play on systems with weaker specifications, such as laptops.

In addition to a Free Play mode with classic, open-ended gameplay, the games contain a structured, linear story mode where players are required to complete a series of goals to progress in the storyline. Three games have been released to date.

The Sims Medieval 

The Sims Medieval is an action role-playing spin-off game released in 2011. It is set in medieval times, and although it is based on The Sims 3 engine, it plays very differently. The Sims Medieval has one expansion pack, Pirates and Nobles.

Shut down

The Sims Online 

In December 2002, Electronic Arts released the Maxis-developed The Sims Online, later named EA Land. It recreates The Sims as a massively multiplayer online game, where human players can interact with each other. The spin-off did not achieve the same level of success as the original. Reviews for The Sims Online were lackluster; many likening its experience to an enormous chat room. On August 1, 2008, EA Land was shut down.

The Sims Carnival 

The Sims Carnival was a casual game brand of The Sims. It had two separate product lines; the first was an online community of crowd-sourced web games and the second was a line of packaged game titles sold via retail stores and digital downloads.

The Sims Social 

Launched in August 2011, The Sims Social was a Flash-based game developed by Playfish for Facebook. EA announced the game was upgraded from Beta to Live status in a press release issued on August 23, 2011. Due to players' negative responses, the game has been shut down and was removed from Facebook on June 14, 2013.

Console and handheld versions

The Sims era 

The Sims was the game's first console release and shares the same name as the PC game. It was released for the PlayStation 2, Xbox, and Nintendo GameCube. The gameplay is similar to the PC version but follows a mission-based storyline in addition to the sandbox mode found in the original game. Objectives are added which allow the player to unlock new furniture and locations.

The Sims Bustin' Out is the second title in The Sims console series. Bustin' Out was released in the fourth quarter of 2003 for the PlayStation 2, Xbox, and Nintendo GameCube. Much like its predecessor, the game features two modes: Bust Out Mode, which is mission-based gameplay, and Freeplay Mode which is similar to the original The Sims PC game. The PlayStation 2 version featured the option to play online, though EA no longer supports it. Separate handheld versions were developed for the Game Boy Advance and N-Gage, which allow the player to directly control the Sim character for the first time.

The Urbz: Sims in the City is a game focused on Sims living in an urban setting within Sim City. The player must earn a reputation and complete tasks for characters. It was released for Xbox, PlayStation 2, and Nintendo GameCube. It features Black Eyed Peas as NPCs. Like The Sims Bustin' Out, separate handheld versions were developed for the Nintendo DS and the Game Boy Advance, which serve as a sequel to their predecessors.

The Sims 2 

The Sims 2, The Sims 2: Pets, and The Sims 2: Castaway have been released for various platforms including the Wii, PlayStation 2, PSP, Xbox, and Nintendo DS systems. The Sims 2: Apartment Pets, considered a sequel to The Sims 2: Pets by Electronic Arts, was only released for the Nintendo DS.

In addition, EA has released several The Sims titles for the iPod Nano (3rd and 4th generation), the iPod Classic, and the iPod (5th generation). Some of these titles include: The Sims Bowling, The Sims DJ, and The Sims Pool.

MySims 

MySims is a series of console games created by EA for the Wii and Nintendo DS (with SkyHeroes being the exception). They feature Chibi-like characters (a tiny bit smaller and similar to the Wii's Mii avatars). The first game in the series was released in September 2007. MySims SkyHeroes, the newest addition to the MySims line of games, was released in September 2010.

The Sims 3 

The Sims 3, The Sims 3: World Adventures, and The Sims 3: Ambitions were released for iOS. In addition, The Sims 3 was also released for Android, PlayStation 3, Xbox 360, Nintendo DS, Wii and Nintendo 3DS. The 3DS version of the game was a launch title for the console. The Sims 3: Pets was released for PlayStation 3, Xbox 360, and Nintendo 3DS.

The Sims 4 

Versions for the PlayStation 4 and Xbox One consoles were released on November 17, 2017. Unlike previous console ports, the console version of The Sims 4 has feature parity with the PC/Mac version, and also shares the same expansion packs, "game packs", "stuff packs" and "kits".

The Sims FreePlay 

The Sims FreePlay is the first free-to-play version of The Sims, for iOS and Android, was released worldwide on December 15, 2011, for iOS devices, and on February 15, 2012, for Android. The game made it to Kindle Fire in October 2012, to BlackBerry 10 on July 31, 2013, and Windows Phone 8 in September 2013. Unlike other Sims games, The Sims FreePlay runs in real-time and takes real-time to complete actions. Players can progress through 55 levels and unlock new content, create up to 34 Sims, build town map buildings, and complete goals to earn Lifestyle Points, Simoleons, Social Points, and XP (Experience Points). All of these (except for Social Points) can be obtained by baking,   planting, going to school (Only for preteens and teens), or working. To get Social Points, you will have to go to neighboring houses or add your Facebook friends.

The Sims Mobile 

The Sims Mobile is the second free-to-play version of The Sims for Android and iOS, The Sims Mobile was announced on May 9, 2017, in a launch trailer with a soft launch for Brazil, and was released worldwide on March 6, 2018. It features multiplayer and story-mode elements in an attempt to offer a playing experience akin to the main Sims installments.

Legacy 
The success of The Sims has resulted in Guinness World Records awarding the series numerous world records, including, as of 2017, "Most Expansion Packs for a Videogame Series" and "Best Selling PC Game Series", with sales estimates ranging from 36 to 50 million units. The series ranks 10th among the best-selling video game franchises of all times, with a sales figure of over 200 million combining all the entries in the series. As of October 2019, all The Sims games combined generated lifetime sales of more than US$5 billion.

Cancelled film 
A live-action drama film based upon the franchise was announced in 2007. The Sims film rights had been purchased by 20th Century Fox in the same year. It was to be written by Brian Lynch and produced by John Davis. However, the film remained in development hell for a number of years. In 2019, following Disney's acquisition of 21st Century Fox's assets, the film along with numerous video game-based movies in development at Fox were cancelled.

Reality television show 

EA, in partnership with Turner Sports and BuzzFeed, created The Sims Spark'd, a four-episode reality competition television show that premiered on the TBS network on July 17, 2020. The series, filmed from December 9 to 14, 2019, features 12 contestants, selected from those known to feature The Sims in their online gaming channels, tasked with challenges within The Sims 4 to create characters and stories following the challenge's themes and limitations. Each competitors' creation is judged by a panel consisting of YouTube personality Kelsey Impicciche, singer and songwriter Tayla Parx, and EA Maxis developer Dave Miotke, with the finalist winning a  prize. The show is hosted by American Idol season 14 finalist Rayvon Owen.

See also 

 List of The Sims video games
 List of Sim video games

References

External links 
 
 
 
 
 

 
Electronic Arts franchises
God games
LGBT-related video games
Life simulation games
Satirical video games
Video game franchises introduced in 2000
Casual games
Maxis
Metafictional video games